Dera Ghazi Khan International Airport or D. G. Khan Airport  (Balochi: ڈیرہ غازی خان بالی پٹ) is  from the city centre of Dera Ghazi Khan, Punjab, Pakistan. It caters mainly to the population of Dera Ghazi Khan. Now Dera Ghazi Khan airport is closed without any reason.

See also 
 List of airports in Pakistan

References

External links
 

Airports in Punjab, Pakistan